Henrik Samuelsson (born February 7, 1994) is an American professional ice hockey player of Swedish ancestry. He is currently playing for HK Levice in the Slovak 1. Liga. Samuelsson was most recently with the Manchester Storm of the UK EIHL . Previously, he played with the Worcester Railers of the ECHL, Modo Hockey in the Swedish Hockey League and the Arizona Coyotes in the National Hockey League (NHL).

Playing career
As a youth, Samuelsson played in the 2007 Quebec International Pee-Wee Hockey Tournament with a minor ice hockey team from Phoenix, Arizona.

Samuelsson was drafted twenty-seventh overall by the Phoenix Coyotes in the 2012 NHL Entry Draft whilst playing major junior hockey for the Edmonton Oil Kings of the Western Hockey League.  On March 11, 2013, he was signed to a three-year entry-level contract with the Coyotes.

On February 26, 2015, Henrik made his NHL debut in a game against the New York Rangers. His father Ulf was in attendance as an assistant coach for the Rangers.

During the 2016–17 season, having contributed with just 2 goals in 20 games with AHL affiliate the Tucson Roadrunners, Samuelsson was traded by the Coyotes to the Edmonton Oilers, in exchange for former junior teammate, Mitch Moroz, on February 1, 2017. With the Oilers AHL affiliate, the Bakersfield Condors, Samuelsson appeared in 5 scoreless games.

As a free agent, Samuelsson opted to continue his career in the ECHL, agreeing to a one-year deal with the Idaho Steelheads on September 7, 2017.

As of January 2020, Samuelsson was playing for the Manchester Storm in the EIHL.

Samuelsson originally agreed a move to Saryarka Karagandy of the VHL for the 2020/21 season. However, Samuelsson instead moved to Slovak 1. Liga side HK Levice.

Personal life
Henrik is the son of two-time Penguins Stanley Cup winner Ulf Samuelsson and his older brother Philip currently plays for IK Oskarshamn in the SHL. Samuelsson was born in Pittsburgh, while his father was a member of the Penguins. As a result of his father's career, Samuelsson lived in four different cities before settling in Scottsdale, Arizona, following the latter's playing career.

Career statistics

Regular season and playoffs

International

Awards and honors

References

External links

1994 births
Arizona Coyotes draft picks
Arizona Coyotes players
American men's ice hockey right wingers
American people of Swedish descent
Bakersfield Condors players
Edmonton Oil Kings players
Ice hockey people from Pittsburgh
Idaho Steelheads (ECHL) players
Living people
Modo Hockey players
National Hockey League first-round draft picks
Portland Pirates players
Rockford IceHogs (AHL) players
Springfield Falcons players
Tucson Roadrunners players
Manchester Storm (2015–) players
HK Levice players
USA Hockey National Team Development Program players
American expatriate ice hockey players in Sweden
American expatriate ice hockey players in England
American expatriate ice hockey players in Canada
American expatriate ice hockey players in Slovakia